Rachel Fairburn is an English comedian. She was born in Harpurhey, Manchester and attended St Monica's High School. She is co-host of the hit comedy podcast All Killa No Filla along with fellow comedian Kiri Pritchard-McLean.  All Killa No Filla has been named one of the top eight true crime podcasts of 2018 by The Independent, Esquire 's number two 'Best True Crime Podcast' in 2018 and one of the best podcast of 2018 by The Guardian. Time cited their podcast as an example of how female comedians are talking about their experiences in the ＃MeToo era. Fairburn and Pritchard-McLean launched their podcast in 2014.

Fairburn has been working as a comedian since 2008. The Daily Telegraph named her one of the best comedians at the 2018 Edinburgh Festival Fringe. Fairburn has appeared on the BBC's 'Funny from the Fringe', the 'Evil Genius with Russell Kane' and 'Breaking the News' on BBC Radio Scotland. Before she was a comedian, she worked full-time in a rare books library.

References

External links

Living people
1983 births
21st-century English comedians
English women comedians
British women podcasters
British podcasters
English podcasters
People associated with true crime
People from Harpurhey